NEROCA FC is an Indian professional football club based in Imphal, Manipur, that competes in I-League, the second tier of Indian football league system. Founded in 1965, and nicknamed "Orange Brigade", the club made their I-League 2nd Division debut in the 2015–16 season. Winning the 2016–17 league, they secured promotion to the I-League.

NEROCA is the only club from Northeast India to reach the final of the coveted Durand Cup. The club also competes in the Manipur State League.

History

Formation and early years
North Eastern Re-Organising Cultural Association (NEROCA) was established in 1965 with the hope of improving quality in the field of cultural activities and sports in the Indian state of Manipur. It was registered under the Manipur State co-operative Society Registration Act bearing registration No. 1016 of 1972. NEROCA is a registered football club of Imphal East District Football Association and affiliated with All Manipur Football Association (AMFA). NEROCA has participated in the Manipur State League (MSL), since its inception and finished second-placed in the MSL 2007.

2014–present
In the 9th season of Manipur State League (2014), NEROCA won the championship trophy.
With the aim of participating in the I-League 2nd Division from 2015–16. As per the norms of All India Football Federation (AIFF), the nomenclature of NEROCA was changed to NEROCA Football Club.

NEROCA competed in the 2015–16 and 2016–17 I-League 2nd Division seasons. They emerged as champions of the 2016–17 season with 26 points in 10 matches from the Final Round, and qualified for the 2017–18 season of the I-League. They also clinched the title of Manipur State League in 2016.

The biggest achievement of NEROCA is emerging as the runners-up in the 2017–18 I-League. Under the coaching of Gift Raikhan, they finished campaign with 32 points from 18 matches. In that season, NEROCA brought Vector X as their official shirt sponsor.

In the 2020–21 I-League, NEROCA finished bottom of the Relegation Stage and got formally relegated, but were reinstated by AIFF after viewing the situation of Covid-19 pandemic.

On 4 July 2021, NEROCA signed Khogen Singh as their head coach for the 2021–22 I-League season, and began the league journey with a 3–2 win against Sreenidi Deccan on 27 December 2021. They achieved seventh position in league table. They later participated in 2022 Durand Cup.

Crest and colours
In the official club crest, there is map of Manipur in background and an anchor of sailing boat in foreground.

The official colours of NEROCA are orange and green.

Kit manufacturers and shirt sponsors

Stadium

Khuman Lampak Main Stadium in Imphal, Manipur, is used as the home ground of NEROCA Football Club for all their home matches in both the domestic and regional leagues. Opened in 1999, the stadium is owned by All Manipur Football Association and has a capacity of 35,285 spectators. Their first home match in the I-League was played on 15 December 2017 against Chennai City FC.

Support and rivalry

Supporters
NEROCA had the 2nd highest average attendance for the 2018–19 I League season.  In the 2017–18 season, NEROCA had the highest attendance in the I-League.

Rivalries

NEROCA have participated in the Imphal Derby with city rival TRAU. The two clubs are the only two from Imphal to have played professional league football. The Imphal Derby gained fame in 2022 during the 131st edition of Durand Cup when competitive football returned to the city after COVID-19 pandemic in India. The Government of Manipur declared a half-holiday for all governmental and educational institutions in build-up to the match on 18 August, where NEROCA defeated TRAU by 3–1 in Group-C opener.

In the Northeast Derby (I-League), they have a rivalry with Mizoram-based club Aizawl.

Players

First-team squad

Personnel

Current technical staff

Team records

Key
Tms. = Number of teams
Pos. = Position in league
Attendance/G = Average league attendance

Overall records
updated on 28 May 2017

Top scorer
updated on 16 August 2021

Notable players

Past and present internationals

The players below had senior international cap(s) for their respective countries. Players whose name is listed, represented their countries before or after playing for NEROCA FC.

India
 Sushil Kumar Singh (2016–2018)
 Govin Singh (2016–2018)
 Gouramangi Singh (2017–2018)

Asia
 Chencho Gyeltshen (2019)
 Akhlidin Israilov (2017)
 Abhishek Rijal (2020–2021)
 Prakash Budhathoki (2020–2021)
 Mohamad Kdouh (2020–2022)
  Bektur Talgat Uulu (2022–)

North America
 Fabien Vorbe (2017–2018)
 Judah García (2020–2021)
 Marvin Phillip (2019–2020)
 Nathaniel Garcia (2020–2021)
 Richard Roy (2017–2018)
  Taryk Sampson (2019–2020)
 Jourdaine Fletcher (2022–)

Africa
 Varney Kallon (2016–2019, 2020)
 Eduardo Ferreira (2018–2019)
 Boubacar Diarra (2019–2020)
 Gaty Kouami (2019–2020)
  David Simbo (2022–)

Managerial record
Information correct after match played on 7 March 2022. Only competitive matches are counted.

Honours

League
 I-League
Runners-up (1): 2017–18
 I-League 2nd Division
Champions (1): 2016–17
Third place (1): 2015–16
Manipur State League
Champions (2): 2014, 2016
Runners-up (1): 2009

Cup
 Durand Cup
Runners-up (1): 2016
 Tiddim Invitation Football Trophy
Champions (1): 2004
Runners-up (2): 2005, 2007
 Churachand Singh Trophy
Champions (6): 2000, 2012–13, 2014–15, 2016, 2018–19, 2019
Runners-up (2): 2002, 2008
 Bodousa Cup
Runners-up (2): 2010, 2015
 Shirui Lily Cup
Runners-up (1): 2011

See also
 List of football clubs in Manipur
 Sports in Manipur

References

External links
NEROCA FC official website

Team info at BeSoccer
Team info at Global Sports Archive
Team info at Everything For Football

Association football clubs established in 1965
I-League clubs
I-League 2nd Division clubs
Football clubs in Manipur
1965 establishments in India
NEROCA FC